Djeser may refer to either of:

 Djeser, an alternative spelling of Djoser, a pharaoh of Egypt's Third Dynasty
 djeser, the ancient Egyptian unit of measurement sometimes equated with the foot